Duke Corporate Education (Duke CE) is a premier global provider of leadership offerings that enable leaders at all levels to adapt and move the organization forward. Duke CE is a support organization of Duke University, with global offices located London, UK; Johannesburg, South Africa; Singapore and Durham, North Carolina in the US.

History

Duke CE was established in July 2000, associated with Duke University's Fuqua School of Business.

On May 15, 2017, Duke CE announced a partnership with Strategy Execution (now Korn Ferry) for a training program.

Ranking

Duke CE has been ranked among the top three providers in the world by the Financial Times for 19 years and #1 in BusinessWeek for 12 years. The In 2019, the Financial Times ranked Duke CE #2 in Customised Executive Education.

Offices

Duke CE’s headquarters are in Durham, NC. Other offices are in London, Johannesburg and Singapore.

Publishing
Dialogue is Duke CE's quarterly journal. It is published by LID Publishing.

Notes and references
   

Corporate Education
2000 establishments in North Carolina